The 1932 Brisbane Rugby League premiership was the 24th season of Brisbane's semi-professional rugby league football competition. Eight teams from across Brisbane competed for the premiership, which culminated in the minor premiers Western Suburbs defeating Past Grammars (now Norths Devils) 8-7 in the grand final.

Ladder

Finals

References

Rugby league in Brisbane
Brisbane Rugby League season